Shureki (also Romanized as Shūrekī, Shooraki, and Shūrakī; also known as Gepū Shūrakī, Gīv Shā’īkī, Gīv Shū’īkī, Gīv Shūrakī, and Sūraki) is a village in Baghak Rural District, in the Central District of Tangestan County, Bushehr Province, Iran. At the 2006 census, its population was 1,396, in 313 families.

References 

Populated places in Tangestan County